The European Go Championship or Congress (EGC) is the annual and main event of many organised by the European Go Federation for players of the board game Go. It consists of a 2-week open competition, one round per day, making a total of 10 rounds with a champion ultimately emerging - the player with the most (or best) wins. The congress has taken place in a different European city each year, since the first contest in 1983. During these two weeks, the best Go players in Europe fight for the title of European Champion. Entry in recent years has ranged from a low of 290 to a high of 718 players.

History 

The first European Go Championship was held in 1938. The current annual series begun in 1957, with the first championship held in Cuxhaven, Germany. Germany has been quite dominant at the championships.

In 1961 the 5th European Go Championship was held in August in Baden, where Japanese professional players Kensaku Segoe and Utaro Hashimoto gave exhibitions.

In 1976 European Go Congress was held in Cambridge with 150 European players vying for titles among five separate tournaments which varied the games played, and including a tournament at the game of 'Lightning Go,' where the game must be played far more rapidly than in a traditional match. The festivities were described by United Press International, reporting on the event, as a "two week orgy of go."

In 1977 the 21st championship was held in Rijswijk in the Netherlands. Although not allowed to play in the competition, two Japanese professional players attended and provided instruction and engaged in simultaneous exhibitions. Seminars were given in go theory, computer go and lightning go.

Recent highlights

Czech Republic 2005 
In Prague, Alexandre Dinerchtein won against Cătălin Țăranu in the 5th round.

Italy 2006 
In Frascati, Alexandre Dinerchtein lost against the 2001 Champion Andrei Kulkov in the 6th round.

Svetlana Shikshina won the title.

Austria 2007 
In Villach, Ilya Shikshin won the title, despite losing to Alexandre Dinerchtein in the 8th round.

Sweden 2008 
In Leksand, Ondrej Silt from the Czech Republic beat Cătălin Țăranu in Round 4.
In Round 5, Alexandre Dinerchtein won against the 2006 Champion Svetlana Shikshina.
Cătălin Țăranu beat the 2007 Champion Ilya Shikshin in Round 8.
The 5-dan Go professional Cătălin Țăranu became the second Romanian player to become European Go Champion.

Netherlands 2009 
In Groningen, the young 5-dan Thomas Debarre from France defeated Cătălin Țăranu in Round 4. In round 5, the 3-times European Champion from the Netherlands, Rob van Zeijst, lost against Alexandre Dinerchtein. Round 9 saw victory by the 2008 Champion Cătălin Țăranu against Alexandre Dinerchtein. Alexandre Dinerchtein remained ahead on tiebreak to win the title, his seventh time as European go Champion.

Finland 2010 
In Tampere, as a first act of the championship, Cornel Burzo from Romania beat the reigning champion, the Russian professional Alexandre Dinerchtein. Cătălin Țăranu won against Rob Van Zeijst in the 3rd round. The fourth round featured a very long game between Taranu and Ilya Shikshin. These two players were undefeated since the beginning of this year's competition. Shikshin finally won the game, to continue his consecutive victories (6 winning rounds).

The young Artem Kachanovskyi from Ukraine stopped the winning ascension of Shikshin at the seventh round. The next rounds were a fight for the title for these two players. Kachanovskyi led first by beating Csaba Mérő at the 8th round, and the 2009 European Youth Champion, Ali Jabarin, in the 9th round, but he lost his final game against Kim JungHyeop, a Korean player. Shikshin won the title by beating Cristian Pop in the 8th round and Dinerchtein in the final round.
During this tournament, the two leaders won games against Korean players.
This is the second European title for Ilya Shikshin.

France 2011 

The Championship was held at the "University of Bordeaux I" campus in Talence, from July 23 to August 6.
The number of registered players exceeded the 800 expected players, meaning already that European Go is healthy.
These amateur players 
were from all European countries, ranked from 30 kyu to 7 dan, professional players from Asia will also participate (e.g. Japan, China and South Korea). The French hosting organisation was the Fédération française de go (FFG).  
The pre-registration board showed the participation of previous champions and possible future title-holders such as 
 Cătălin Țăranu
 Ilya Shikshin
 Svetlana Shikshina
 Alexandre Dinerchtein
 Artem Kachanovskyi
 Cristian Pop

This edition also accommodated the first Pandanet Go European Team Championship, a new competition where Romania, Hungary, Russia and Ukraine will try to obtain the first title.

As a side-event, a professional competition was held - some games of the China Weiqi League were played.

Yumi Hotta, Hikaru no Go-writer, attended for a conference during the event.

The EGC is reliant on generous international sponsorship. For the third consecutive year, Zhuyeqing Tea - the official sponsor of the Chinese national Go team - are the main sponsor of the Congress.

Germany 2012 
The 2012 EGC was held by the river Rhine, in the municipal hall of Bonn-Bad Godesberg, from 21 July to 4 August 2012.

Poland 2013 
Olsztyn in Poland was the host for the 2013 Congress.

Romania 2014 
The 2014 EGC was held in Sibiu, Romania, a former European Capital of Culture.

Czechia 2015 
The 2015 EGC was held in Liberec, Czech Republic.

Russia 2016 
The 2016 EGC was held in Saint Petersburg, Russia.

Germany 2017 
The 2017 EGC was held in Oberhof, Germany with the highest number of participants in history.

Italy 2018 
The 2018 EGC was held in Pisa, Italy.

Belgium 2019 
The 2019 EGC was held in Brussels, Belgium.

2020 and 2021 
In both of these years, the EGC did not take place due to the COVID-19 pandemic. The European Championship was held online in its place.

Romania 2022 
The 64th EGC is planned to take place from the 23rd July – 7th August in Vatra Dornei, Romania.

Planned championships 
European Go Congresses, at which the European Go Champion is decided, are planned few years in advance to cater for up to 800 players. Each year, the hosting country's Go association plays a large part in the planning and organisation. Below are the planned future locations.

 2023 – Markkleeberg, close to Leipzig, Germany (originally planed for Kamianets-Podilskyi, Ukraine),
 2024 – Toulouse, France.

Past champions 
As recorded in the European Go Federation web-site:

European individual champions

Open European individual champions
From 1984, the Championship became open, allowing participants from outside Europe. This attracted strong players from China and Korea, who have regularly finished in the top spots. Until 2010, the highest finishing European national would be declared "European Champion", with the highest finisher of the tournament being declared "European Open Champion"; the latter title was often won by Korean nationals.

From 2011 onwards, the tournament format was changed. The tournament now consists of 7 rounds of MacMahon, followed by a 3-round single elimination knockout between the top 8 eight European nationals. The winner of this knockout is declared European Champion; the player with the most wins after 10 rounds is declared European Open Champion.

Open European pair champions

See also 

European Pair Go Championship

References 

European championships
Go competitions in Europe